Renal segmental hypoplasia  is a kidney with a partially developed or atrophic renal cortex.

Presentation

Ask-Upmark kidneys are a cause of secondary hypertension that can be curable.

Cause
It is thought to be congenital or the consequence of vesicoureteral reflux.
in IVU “Slit scar” is seen.

Diagnosis

See also
 Hypertension

References

External links 

 Ask-Upmark kidney - whonamedit.com
 Gross image of Ask-Upmark kidney - nature.com
 Neuroretinitis, Ask-Upmark kidney and abnormal brain MRI - Journal of Pediatric Neurosciences

Nephrology